"Salam Affandina" was the national anthem of Egypt from 1871 to 1922 and 1936–1958, then it was replaced by "Walla Zaman Ya Selahy". It was renamed "Egyptian Republican Anthem" in 1953 after the Egyptian revolution of 1952. It was instrumental and had no official lyrics.

Other Uses

Usage by the Coptic Orthodox Church 
The melody for the anthem was adopted by the Coptic Orthodox Church for the Papal Hymn of "Kalos Akee". This hymn is chanted to welcome the Coptic Pope upon his return to the homeland from travel abroad. Originally, the hymn had no original or unique tone of its own, with each of its verses being sung in a tone recycled from one of the other hymns of the church. In the 20th century, Cantor Mikhail Girgis El Batanouny musically arranged the hymn to the tone of "Salam Affandina", which had been the Egyptian national anthem at the time.

Usage in Sephardic Synagogues 
The melody of the song has been adopted by Sephardic Jewry and is currently sung in Sephardic synagogues in Israel when the Torah Scroll is taken out of the ark.

References

Anthems of Egypt
Historical national anthems